Plungė Manor is a former Ogiński residential manor in Plungė, Lithuania. It now harbors the Samogitian(Žemaitija in Lithuanian) art museum.

History 
Plungė manor has been mentioned since 1565. For many years, the estate was a landholding of the Grand Duke of Lithuania and Plungė eldership. It was administered by different noblemen including Dorohostaiskiai, Valavičiai, Krišpinai-Kiršenšteinai and Karp.

In 1779, King Stanisław Augustus Poniatowski (1732-1798) assigned Plungė eldership and the manor to Vilnius Bishop Ignacy Jakub Massalski (1726–1794).

The Zubov Family 

In 1795, following the 3rd Partition of the Polish–Lithuanian Commonwealth, Catherine II, Tsarina of the Russian Empire gave 170,000 acres of land to Platon Zubov (1767–1822) for his loyalty and service. Zubov was one of the initiators of the Polish Partitions and Catherine’s favourite.

On March 8, 1806 Count Zubov received Plungė Estate from Wincenty Gaweł Potocki (1740-1825).

The estate was later inherited by Platon Zubov’s nephew, Alexandrovich Zubov.

The Zubov family would own the area for the next 67 years (1806–1873).

The Zubov period was very important for the area. It is thought that the villa (known by Plungė people as the ‘clock-house’) imitating Florence’s Gothic masterpiece Palazzo Vecchio was built on the estate park during Alexandrovich Zubov’s time. The date ‘1846’ is inscribed on the foundation of the south façade, and probably indicates the year of construction.

The Zubov family built buildings, repaired roads, businesses flourished and educational and cultural institutions were established.

Platon Zubov’s brother, Count Dmitry Zubov (1764-1836) developed the landscaped parks at both Kretinga and Plungė Manors. They were completed in 1839.

In 1873 Alexandrovich Zubov family sold Plungė estate to Michał Ogiński.

Michał Mikołaj Ogiński (1849-1902) 
Over the next thirteen years, Michał Mikołaj Ogiński constructed a new ensemble of buildings at Plungė Manor.

In 1879, he ordered the main mansion to be built, designed by architect Karl Lorenz, who was of German origin. Lorenz and the performer of works Gotrfried Schrank created the flamboyant ensemble, incorporated into the old mixed-style park. The palace came to be known as ‘Versailles of Samogitia’. This was the Oginski family's residential home.

The two servants’ houses (on the right the manor administration and kitchen were located and on the left, a chapel, and later an orphanage), a Neo-Gothic stud farm, monumental gates of the park with a guard’s house, a laundry house, auxiliary gates and the house for the pheasant keeper, were also built. The ‘clock-house’ was reconstructed next to the orangery, and other buildings for servants were built.

The interior was decorated with moldings, paintings, ornate stoves and collectible furniture.  The plaster moulding came from the workshops of Kazimierz Sommer in Warsaw.

Ogiński was a passionate collector, and filled the mansion with hundreds of family portraits, marble busts, porcelain, jewelry, and tapestry collections, archaeological finds and numismatic collections, an archive and a library. At the turn of the 20th century, the Ogiński residence was famous for its musical traditions, collections of European and folk art, archaeology, numismatics, books, manuscripts, feasts organized by the hosts of the manor, along with scientific, technological and economic innovations. The palace had a large and rich library and a family museum. 

Michał Ogiński was a philanthropist and educator and was known for fostering scientific and technical innovations in agriculture. Through 1873–1902 the Ogiński mansion operated the Plungė orchestra school. The school trained musicians for string, wind and symphony orchestras. The musicians of the Plungė orchestra played on the Eiffel Tower in Paris on a French  national holiday. The famous Lithuanian composer and artist Mikalojus Konstantinas Ciurlionis (1875-1911) also studied here. Michał Ogiński went on to support Ciurlionis' studies at the Warsaw and Leipzig Conservatory.

Maria Ogińsks née Skurzewska (1857-1945) saw to the care and education of orphans and the poor.

The Ogiński family also devoted a great deal of time to the town of Plungė. The couple built a house of commerce, a Jewish gymnasium and on orphanage.

Michał Ogiński died young (in 1902). Duchess Maria Ogińska (1857-1945) eventually moved to Poland.

From that time the manor was governed by designated administrators. Although they tried to honestly fulfil their functions, the property gradually fell into decline.

After World War I the palace suffered from fire.

Interwar Period 

During the Lithuanian land reform, in the period from 1918 to 1919, the lands of Plungė Manor and holdings were expropriated. After the Maria Ogińska refused to return to Lithuania, in 1921, the state took over the manor house as well.

Soon different institutions were set up. By 1934, the buildings of the manor accommodated the gymnasium of Saulė, Motiejus Valančius School, a teachers’ seminary, and the national stud farm.

From 1934 to 1940, when the 6th infantry of Margis and the 4th regiment of artillery were stationed at the manor, the ensemble and park were transferred for their use. The grounds had the headquarters of the military units, an officers’ club, and some apartments were installed for officers’ families.

Soviet Period 
At the beginning of World War II, the palace and other buildings were severely damaged by fire and vandalization by Soviet soldiers.

Reconstruction started in 1956. The manor was reconstructed and restored again in 1961. The same year, a secondary school was established in the palace. In 1964, Plungė Manorhoused the Construction Technical School.

In 1994, the Samogitian Art Museum started operating. By that time, the manor house had no authentic interiors or cultural treasures left.

The Present Period 
Today the manor houses the Samogitian Art Museum.

Manor Park 
The famous Plungė park was established at around the middle of the eighteenth century. The area of the park is about 143 acres. (apx. 0.6 km2 The park is planted in the riversides of the river Babrungas. Nowadays it is one of the most remarkable and valuable compounded parks of Lithuania.

Oak of the Thunder God 
In the borders of the manor park, grows a huge oak, called the oak of the Thunder God, or Perkūnas in Lithuanian, from ancient pagan beliefs. Legend tells that priestess Galinda stoked a sacred fire near this oak. One day her lover went forth to war against the Crusaders to defend his homeland nation. Sadly, he never returned. The chief priest, seeing Galinda’s tears and heartache, began to teach her that only a sacred fire can quench her earthly pain. Once, when Galinda was weeping under the oak, a thunder struck the tree. Oak shook greatly, some soil has poured into its trunk – and soon the flower of incredible beauty has sprouted out of the trunk of the oak. Since then people started to call it on behalf of Thunder God. Some believe that the huge oak that grows in the park is the same one from the legend. It was declared a National Monument.

References

External links

Manor houses in Lithuania
Gothic Revival architecture in Lithuania
Ogiński family